Moyer is a surname. Notable people with the surname include:

 Alex Moyer (born 1963), American football linebacker
 Alice Curtice Moyer (1866–1937), American writer and suffragist
 Allen Moyer (born 1958), American set designer
 Andrew J. Moyer (1899–1959), American microbiologist
 Brett Moyer (born 1984), American lacrosse player
 Brian C. Moyer, Director of the U.S. Bureau of Economic Analysis (from 2014)
 Buck Moyer (Virgil A. Moyer Jr., 1920–2015), American Lutheran pastor
 Carrie Moyer (born 1960), American painter and writer
 Charles Moyer (1866–1929), president of the Western Federation of Miners
 David Moyer, American Anglican bishop
 Denny Moyer (1939–2010), American boxer
 Donald R. Moyer (1930–1951), United States Army soldier, posthumous Medal of Honor recipient
 Diane Moyer (born 1958), American field hockey player
 Ed Moyer (1885–1962), American baseball player
 Ellen Moyer (born 1936), American politician, mayor of Annapolis, Maryland (2001–2009)
 Fred Moyer (1887–1951), Canadian politician
 Frederick Moyer (born 1957), American pianist
 Harvey A. Moyer (1853–1935), American businessman
 J. Keith Moyer, American newspaper publisher, editor, and journalist
 Jack Moyer (1929–2004), American marine biologist
 Jamie Moyer (born 1962), Major League Baseball pitcher
 Jay R. Moyer (1947–2018), member of the Pennsylvania House of Representatives (2007–2008)
 John Moyer (disambiguation), several people
 Jonathan H. Moyer, American historian of politics and contributor to Mormonism: A Historical Encyclopedia
 Justin Moyer (born 1977), American musician
 Kate Moyer (born 2008), Canadian actress
 Ken Moyer (born 1966), American football player
 Kermit Moyer (born 1943), American author
 Lauren Moyer (born 1995), American field hockey player
 Lydia Moyer, American contemporary artist
 Lee Moyer, American painter, illustrator, graphic designer
 Melinda Wenner Moyer, American science journalist
 Mike Moyer (born 1971), American author and professor
 Maurice Moyer (1918–2012), American Presbyterian minister and civil rights activist
 Paul Moyer (born 1941), television broadcaster
 Raymond Moyer (disambiguation), several people
 Roger Moyer (1934–2015), American politician, mayor of Annapolis, Maryland (1965–1973)
 Sam Moyer (born 1983), American artist
 Samuel Moyer (c. 1609 – 1683), English merchant and politician
 Samuel L. Moyer (1879–1951), American football coach
 Stephen Moyer (born 1969), British actor
 Tawny Moyer (born 1957), American actress
 Thomas J. Moyer (1939–2010), American jurist, chief justice of the Ohio Supreme Court (1987–2010)
 Tom Moyer (1919–2014), American boxer, movie theater chain magnate, real estate developer, and philanthropist
 William Moyer, American author and activist

See also
 Moyer Township, Minnesota
 Moir (surname)